Kimberly Reed is an American film director and producer who is best known for her documentaries Prodigal Sons and Dark Money which premiered at the 2018 Sundance Film Festival. In 2007, Filmmaker magazine named her one of the "25 New Faces of Independent Film."

Early life and education 
Kimberly Reed was born in Montana to Lorne and Carol McKerrow. Her father was an ophthalmologist. She has an older brother Marc, who was adopted, and a younger brother, Todd. She played quarterback on the Helena High School football team.

Reed recalls feeling "just this friction" about her assigned gender and having an epiphany when, at the age of six or seven, she saw Renee Richards on television, and thought "whoa, that’s it".

Reed earned a Bachelor of Arts from University of California at Berkeley where she graduated magna cum laude. Reed earned a Master of Arts in film production from San Francisco State University. While in her twenties, she transitioned.

Career

Film

Dark Money
Dark Money premiered at the Sundance Film Festival in 2018. Variety describes the film as a "potent investigative piece." In early 2018 the film traveled to several festivals and the rights to the film were purchased by PBS as part of the POV series of documentaries.

Prodigal Sons
Prodigal Sons is an autobiographical account of Reed's return home to Montana for her 20th high school reunion as a trans woman. The project initially focused on her brother Marc's story and evolved into an exploration of family, sibling rivalry, coming out, and reconciling with the past. It debuted at the Telluride Film Festival in 2008. The Los Angeles Times called it a "succinct, eloquent personal journal". After the release Reed was invited to return to Helena to deliver the 2015 commencement address.

Opera 
Together with Mark Campbell, Reed wrote the libretto for As One, a chamber opera/song cycle composed by Laura Kaminsky. As One is a coming-of-age story about a transgender woman. As One premiered in September 2014 in partnership with American Opera Projects at the Brooklyn Academy of Music.

Recognition 
 Filmmaker magazine: filmmakers to watch
 Cinema Eye Honors
 Towleroad: best film character of the year 2009
 Fellowships from Yaddo and NYFA
 Filmmaker Magazine's list of "25 New Faces of Independent Film," 
 IndieWire's top 10 films of 2008.
 Magnet Magazine's best of 2009 list.

See also
 List of transgender film and television directors

References

Further reading

External links 

American documentary film directors
American film producers
Living people
University of California, Berkeley alumni
San Francisco State University alumni
Year of birth missing (living people)
Film directors from Montana
LGBT film directors
Transgender women